Kiantone (pronounced KIN-tone) is a town in Chautauqua County, New York, United States. As of the 2020 census, the town had a population of 1,388. The town is immediately south of Jamestown and is at the south border of the county.

History 

The area was first settled circa 1807. The town of Kiantone was created in 1853 from part of the town of Carroll.

Geography

U.S. Route 62, New York State Route 60 and County Route 380 pass through the town.

Conewango Creek, a tributary of the Allegheny River, forms most of the eastern border of the town and flows south into Pennsylvania.

Adjacent towns and areas 
Kiantone is bordered by the townships of Pine Grove and Farmington, both in Warren County, Pennsylvania, to the south. To the east is the town of Carroll, and to the west is the town of Busti. To the north is the city of Jamestown and the town of Ellicott.

Demographics

As of the census of 2000, there were 1,385 people, 529 households, and 413 families residing in the town.  The population density was 75.0 people per square mile (29.0/km2).  There were 541 housing units at an average density of 29.3 per square mile (11.3/km2).  The racial makeup of the town was 98.84% White, 0.29% African American, 0.14% Native American, 0.14% from other races, and 0.58% from two or more races. Hispanic or Latino of any race were 0.14% of the population.

There were 529 households, out of which 32.7% had children under the age of 18 living with them, 69.9% were married couples living together, 4.7% had a female householder with no husband present, and 21.9% were non-families. 16.6% of all households were made up of individuals, and 8.1% had someone living alone who was 65 years of age or older.  The average household size was 2.62 and the average family size was 2.92.

In the town, the population was spread out, with 24.3% under the age of 18, 4.8% from 18 to 24, 25.7% from 25 to 44, 28.6% from 45 to 64, and 16.5% who were 65 years of age or older.  The median age was 43 years. For every 100 females, there were 98.7 males.  For every 100 females age 18 and over, there were 100.4 males.

The median income for a household in the town was $44,702, and the median income for a family was $50,893. Males had a median income of $36,382 versus $26,302 for females. The per capita income for the town was $20,716.  About 4.6% of families and 6.9% of the population were below the poverty line, including 9.6% of those under age 18 and 4.7% of those age 65 or over.

Notable person
Elmer Ellsworth Brown, educator; chancellor of New York University

Communities and locations in Kiantone 
Conewango Creek – A stream that forms part of the eastern town boundary.
Kiantone – The hamlet of Kiantone at the junction of County Roads 26 and 49 in the south part of the town.
Stillwater – A hamlet in the northwest corner of the town on NY Route 60 and County Route 380.

References

External links
 Town of Kiantone official website

Towns in Chautauqua County, New York